Rum Cove is a cove indenting the northwest coast of James Ross Island between Tumbledown Cliffs and Cape Obelisk. Named in 1983 by the United Kingdom Antarctic Place-Names Committee (UK-APC) in association with the names of other alcoholic spirits on this coast.

Sources

Coves of Graham Land
Landforms of James Ross Island